Ida Krottendorf (5 April 1927, in Ebreichsdorf – 23 June 1998, in Vienna) was an Austrian actress. She was married from 1955 to Austrian actor Ernst Stankovski and in the second marriage from 1960 until 1991 to Klausjürgen Wussow. Together they had two children, Barbara and Alexander Wussow.

Selected filmography
Kleiner Peter, große Sorgen (1950)
 No Sin on the Alpine Pastures (1950)
 Gateway to Peace (1951)
 Consul Strotthoff (1954)
Wedding Bells (1954)
 Mamitschka (1955)
 The Song of Kaprun (1955)
Liebe, Jazz und Übermut (1957)
4 Schlüssel (1965)
Der Kommissar – Parkplatz-Hyänen (1970)
Derrick - Season 04, Episode 05: "Tod des Wucherers" (1977)
Tatort -  (1978)
 Love Hotel in Tyrol (1978)
Derrick - Season 07, Episode 04: "Tödliche Sekunden" (1980)
Der Bockerer (1981) (directed by Franz Antel)
Derrick - Season 09, Episode 04: "Ein Fall für Harry" (1982)
Derrick - Season 10, Episode 08: "Attentat auf Derrick" (1983)
Why Is There Salt in the Sea? (1988) (based on Brigitte Schwaiger's novel)
Die Kaffeehaus-Clique (1990)
Der Unfisch (1997)
Baby Rex (1998)

External links 
 

1927 births
1998 deaths
People from Baden District, Austria
Austrian film actresses
Austrian television actresses
20th-century Austrian actresses